Blonde Crazy is a 1931 American pre-Code romantic comedy-drama film directed by Roy Del Ruth and starring James Cagney, Joan Blondell, Noel Francis, Louis Calhern, Ray Milland, and Guy Kibbee. The film is notable for one of Cagney's lines, a phrase often repeated by celebrity impersonators:  "That dirty, double-crossin' rat!"

Plot
Bert Harris works for a hotel as a bellboy. One day, he meets Anne Roberts, who signs up as a chambermaid. He takes a fancy to her and lets her in on his racket, conning people out of money. They arrange for married hotel guest A. Rupert Johnson Jr. to be caught in a compromising position with Anne and get $5000 to keep a (fake) policeman from taking him to jail. From there, they leave town and embark on ever grander crooked schemes.

Anne falls in love with Bert, but he does not realize it until it is too late. By the time he proposes to her, she has transferred her affections to the respectable Joe Reynolds and marries him. Bert travels around Europe for a year. When he returns to the United States, he is no longer interested in crime.

However, Anne tracks him down and asks him for $30,000. It turns out that Joe has embezzled that amount from his employer. Bert does not have that much, but he comes up with a plan. He gets Joe to give the keys to the office and the combination of the company safe. He will break into the safe and steal what is left. Everyone will assume that he also took the $30,000 in negotiable bonds. However, Joe double crosses him; he has the police waiting. Bert manages to speed away in his car, but is shot and captured. When Anne comes to see him in his cell, she informs him that she found out what Joe did. Bert persuades her not to reveal everything to the police, telling her it would not help him anyway. She vows to be waiting for him after he serves his sentence, cheering him up.

Cast

Reception
Mordaunt Hall, critic for The New York Times, wrote that "Unedifying though the incidents are and feeble as is the attempt at a moral, the greater part of James Cagney's new picture, 'Blonde Crazy,' ... is lively and cleverly acted."

Time felt the ending was out of place with the rest of the film and was only inserted there to provide a moralistic "law and order" ending.

Cagney's line "That dirty, double-crossin' rat!" was nominated for the American Film Institute 2005 AFI's 100 Years...100 Movie Quotes

Preservation status
 A copy is in the collection of The Library of Congress.

Home media
In 2014, Blonde Crazy was released on DVD in a Forbidden Hollywood box set. The cover features a publicity photo of Cagney and Blondell in a risque, pre-Code bathtub scene.

References

External links
 
 
 
 
 Watch Blonde Crazy at Warner Archive Instant

1931 films
1930s crime comedy-drama films
1930s romantic comedy-drama films
American crime comedy-drama films
American romantic comedy-drama films
American black-and-white films
1930s English-language films
Films about con artists
Films directed by Roy Del Ruth
Films set in hotels
Warner Bros. films
Films with screenplays by Kubec Glasmon
1931 comedy films
1931 drama films
1930s American films